Hulleah J. Tsinhnahjinnie (born 1954) is a Seminole-Muscogee-Navajo photographer, museum director, curator, and professor. She is living in Davis, California. She serves as the director of the C.N. Gorman Museum and teaches at University of California, Davis.

Early life and education
Hulleah J. Tsinhnahjinnie was born into the Bear Clan (Taskigi) of the Seminole Nation and born for the Tsi'naajínii Clan of the Navajo Nation. Her mother, Minnie June Lee McGirt-Tsinhnahjinnie (1927–2016), was Seminole and Muskogee and her father, Andrew Van Tsinajinnie (1916–2000), was Navajo. Her father was a painter and muralist who studied at the Studio in Santa Fe, New Mexico. Tsinhnahjinnie was born in 1954 in Phoenix, Arizona. She grew up outside of Scottsdale; at age 13, she moved to the Navajo Reservation near Rough Rock.

In 1975, she began her art education at the Institute of American Indian Arts in Santa Fe. When she was age 23, Tsinhanahjinne moved to the San Francisco Bay Area for school. In 1978, Tsinhnahjinnie enrolled in the California College of Arts and Crafts (now California College of the Arts) in Oakland, where she earned a Bachelor of Fine Arts in painting with a photography minor in 1981.

She earned a Master of Fine Arts degree in Studio Arts from University of California, Irvine in 2002. During her time at Irvine she focused her work toward digital photos and videos. In that same year, she was awarded the First Peoples Fund Community Spirit Award.

She has self-identified as lesbian.

Career 
She served as a board member for the Intertribal Friendship House, Oakland and the American Indian Contemporary Art Gallery in Oakland. Tsinhanahjinne chooses to display her art and passion through things like newsletters, posters, t-shirts, and photos. She taught her skill of photography and media to younger students.

Currently, Tsinhanahjinne works as a professor of Native American Studies at the University of California, Davis (UC Davis). While she has been working there she holds organized conferences that hold the purpose of bringing together native American photographers like herself to discuss topics such as “Visual Sovereignty”. Along with being a professor for the university, Tsinhanahjinne is the Director of C.N. Gorman Museum at UC Davis.

Artwork
Tsinhnahjinnie began her career as a painter, but "turned to photography as a weapon when her aesthetic/ethnic subjectivity came under fire." Her body of work "plays upon her own autobiography and what it means to be a Native American." Her work uses photography as a means to re-appropriate the Native American as subject. Although she is a photographer, Tsinhnahjinnie often hand-tints her photographs or uses them in collage. She has also used unusual supports for her work, such as car hoods. She shoots her own original photographs, but also frequently retools historical photographs of Native Americans to comment upon the ethnographic gaze of nineteenth-century white photographers. Tsinhnahjinnie also works in film and video.

Using a combination of photography and digital images with a contemporary Native American photography style, she overcomes stereotypes, challenges political ideas, and creates a space for other Natives to express their ideas as well. Her goal with her art is not aimed at the non-natives but instead it is to document her life experience and share it with the world. In a statement on “America Is a Stolen Land”, Tsinhnahjinnie says, “.. the photographs I take are not for White people to look at Native people. I take photographs so Native people can look at Native people. I make photographs for Native people”. The Damn Series which she wrote in 1977 is Tsinhnahjinnie's most widely known piece. Throughout the piece she works in Native knowledge (including humorous jokes) to repurpose images of Natives from colonialist history by shifting them back into a rightfully Indigenous context.

20 years later, in 1994, Tsinhnahjinnie created a series called “Memoirs of an Aboriginal Savant”. She uses fifteen pages of an electronic diary to reflect on life with her family, politics, and other life experiences. The diary is all written with the idea in mind that she will take the viewer on a “journey to the center of an aboriginal mind without the fear of being confronted by the aboriginal herself”. The book begins on the page “1954” (her birth year) and continues to look deeply into her personal life experiences. Through the book she writes herself from a first person point of view in order to convey herself how she sees herself instead of others views.

In many of her key works from the 1990s, Tsinhnahjinnie examined the notion of beauty. Her interest in this subject should be viewed in the context of the “return to beauty” that established itself in art historical discourse in the same period At the time, critics were addressing the taboos which had developed around beauty in Western art over the 20th century and the resurfacing of beauty towards the 1990s. While debated among scholars, these taboos were often characterized as a postmodernist reaction against the past notion of beauty as represented by a passive female body. Artists at the time were navigating a "return to beauty" that took these critiques of beauty into account.

Meanwhile, Tsinhnahjinnie was working from a cultural background where beauty had never been a taboo. She defined the beauty of women in terms of their empowerment, grounded in her own perspective as an Indigenous woman. Tsinhnahjinnie's collage When Did Dreams of White Buffalo Turn to Dreams of White Women? (1990) raises questions about Native women's internalized definitions of beauty. According to Lakota lore, White Buffalo Calf Woman was an exceptionally beautiful woman who introduced the pipe ceremony to the Lakota people. The title of this work addresses the historical shift from an indigenous definition of beauty before colonization, represented by White Buffalo Calf Woman, to a neocolonial one.

Published writings
 Lidchi, Henrietta and Tsinhnahjinnie, H. J., eds. Visual Currencies: Native American Photography. Edinburgh: National Museums of Scotland, 2008.
 Tsinhnahjinnie, H. J. and Passalacqua, Veronica, eds. Our People, Our Land, Our Images: International Indigenous Photographers. Berkeley: Heyday Books, 2008. .
 Tsinhnahjinnie, H. J. "Our People, Our Land, Our Images." Native Peoples Magazine. Nov/Dec. 2006
 Tsinhnahjinnie, H. J. "Native American Photography." The Oxford Companion to Photography Oxford: Oxford University Press, 2004
 Tsinhnahjinnie, H. J. "When is a Photograph Worth a Thousand Words?" Photography's Other Histories. C. Pinney and N. Peterson. Durham: Duke University Press, 2003: 40-52

Exhibitions

Solo exhibitions

Group exhibitions

Notes

References
 Fowler, C. (2019). Aboriginal Beauty and Self-Determination: Hulleah Tsinhnahjinnie's Photographic Projects. In 1331626408 976937976 D. K. Cummings (Author), Visualities 2: More perspectives on contemporary American Indian film and art. East Lansing, MI: Michigan State University Press.
 Heard Museum. Argus: Native American Artists resource collection. Retrieved April 23, 2021, from Argus: Native American Artists Resource Collection
 Lester, Patrick D. The Biographical Directory of Native American Painters. Norman: The Oklahoma University Press, 1995. .
 Reno, Dawn. Contemporary Native American Artists. Brooklyn: Alliance Publishing, 1995. .
 Tsinhnahjinnie, H. J. and Passalacqua, Veronica, eds. Our People, Our Land, Our Images: International Indigenous Photography. Berkeley: Heyday Books, 2008. .
 Celia Stahr. "Tsinhnahjinnie, Hulleah." Grove Art Online. Oxford Art Online. Oxford University Press. Web. 6 Mar. 2016. Tsinhnahjinnie, Hulleah.
 Rushing III, W. Jackson. Native American Art in the Twentieth Century: Makers, Meanings, Histories. London; New York: Routledge, 1999. 
 Paul Apodaca, et al. "Native North American Art." Grove Art Online. Oxford Art Online. Oxford University Press. Web. 6 Mar. 2016 http://www.oxfordartonline.com/subscriber/article/grove/art/T061112pg1.

External links
 Official site

Muscogee people
Seminole
Living people
Two-spirit people
LGBT Native Americans
1954 births
Institute of American Indian Arts alumni
Native American filmmakers
Native American photographers
American women photographers
Artists from Phoenix, Arizona
California College of the Arts alumni
University of California, Irvine alumni
University of California, Davis faculty
Native American women artists
Navajo artists
20th-century Native American women
20th-century Native Americans
21st-century Native American women
21st-century Native Americans
20th-century American photographers
21st-century American photographers
Photographers from Arizona
Filmmakers from Arizona
American women curators
American curators